The Hokkien language uses a broad array of honorific suffixes or prefixes for addressing or referring to people. Most are suffixes.  Honorifics are often non-gender-neutral; some imply a feminine context (such as sió-chiá) while others imply a masculine one (such as sian-siⁿ), and still others imply both.

Common honorifics

Sian-siⁿ
Sian-siⁿ, also pronounced sian-seⁿ in some Hokkien dialects, is the most commonplace male honorific and is a title of respect typically used between equals of any age. Sian-siⁿ is also used to refer to or address authority figures, especially teachers and doctors. The usage is also seen in other East Asian languages (see sensei).

Sió-chiá
Sió-chiá (小姐) is a term for an unmarried woman.

Familial honorifics
Honorifics for family members have two different forms in Hokkien.

For a younger family member to call an elder one, the prefixes a- (阿) or chó͘- (祖) is used as the honorific. The usage may also be used to mention one's own family members. For examples: 

Note that it is very impolite to say lín chó͘-má (your great grandma) in some situations; it may be regarded as a rude singular first personal pronoun for the female speakers. (See Hokkien pronouns)

For someone to mention his or her own parents to a non-family-member, the prefix lāu- (老) is sometimes used to replace the prefix a- as the honorific.

For someone to mention his or her own elder family members to a non-family-member, the prefix án- (俺), which literally means my, is also used in some areas. For examples:

Occupation-related honorifics

Sai
Similar to suffix -su and -sū mentioned later, the suffix -sai (師) is used for some people with skillful techniques; for example, kûn-thâu-sai (拳頭師) for martial artists, phah-thih-á-sai (拍鐵仔師) for blacksmiths, phah-chio̍h-sai (拍石師) for masons, thô͘-chúi-sai (塗水師) for plasterers, chóng-phò͘-sai (總舖師) for chefs and  sai-kōng  (師公) for a daoshi.

Su
Many people with different occupations get their own honorifics with a suffix -su (師) in Hokkien. For example, i-su (醫師) for doctors, io̍h-chè-su (藥劑師) for pharmacists, kang-têng-su (工程師) for engineers, lāu-su (老師) for teachers, and lu̍t-su (律師) for lawyers.

Sū
For academic degrees, the titles are suffixed with -sū (士); for examples, phok-sū (博士) for doctorate degree, se̍k-sū (碩士) for master's degree, and ha̍k-sū (學士) for bachelor's degree. In addition, some occupations have their honorifics with a suffix -sū; for example, hō͘-sū (護士) for nurses, piān-sū (辯士) for voice-overs, and chō͘-sán-sū (助產士) for midwives.

Royal and official honorifics
Pē-hā (陛下) is used for sovereign royalty, similar to "Majesty" in English.
Tiān-hā (殿下) is used for non-sovereign royalty, similar to "Highness" in English.
Chóng-thóng (總統) means president.
Chóng-lí (總理) means prime minister.
Koh-hā (閣下) means "Your Excellency", and is used for heads of state (except for those addressed by Pē-hā or Tiān-hā), heads of government, ministers.

Other honorifics

See also
Chinese honorifics
Japanese honorifics
Korean honorifics

H
Honorifics by language